is a Japanese voice actress and narrator. She performed a song in the NHK program Minna no Uta and currently voices Nami in One Piece.

Filmography

Television animation
1992
Calimero (Priscilla)
Hime-chan's Ribbon (Yumiko)

1994
Chō Kuseninarisou (Tamako)
Lord of Lords Ryu Knight (Princess Lumina)
Mahoujin Guru Guru (Fairy Churika)

1995
Juu Senshi Garukiba (Mayu Hiura, Mireia Eternal)
Zukkoke Sanningumi Kusunoki Yashiki no Guruguru-sama (Yoko Arai)
Tōma Kishinden ONI (Misao)
Ninku (Mika)
Fushigi Yûgi (Yuiren)
Romeo and the Black Brothers (Bianca)

1996
Akachan to Boku (Asako Fujii, Female Student, Information Desk Clerk, Mayumi-sensei)
Kodomo no Omocha (Natsumi Hayama)
You're Under Arrest (Tetsu)
Choja Reideen (Kappei Miyamoto)

1997
Clamp School (Nokoru Imonoyama)
Battle Athletes Victory (Mylandah Arkar Walder)

1998
The Adventures of Mini-Goddess (Belldandy, episodes 1-13 only)
Weiß kreuz (Michiru)
Vampire Princess Miyu (Yui-Li)
Urayasu Tekkin Kazoku (Sakura Oosawagi)
Prince Mackaroo (Kentarou Iwashimizu, Midorioni, Sago Shimizu, Ushimaru)
Pokémon (Lindow Murasame)
Master Keaton (Helen)

1999
Itsumo Kokoro ni Taiyō o! (Mother)
Now and Then, Here and There (Shuzo "Shu" Matsutani)
Kindaichi Shounen no Jikenbo (Hazuki Mogami, Leona Kirishima)
Guru Guru Town Hanamaru-kun (Miinya)
Steel Angel Kurumi (Kaori)
GTO: Great Teacher Onizuka (Anko Uehara)
Zoids (Maria)
One Piece (Nami)

2000
Carried by the Wind: Tsukikage Ran (Meow of the Iron Cat Fist)
Sakura Wars (Kasumi Fujii)
Daa! Daa! Daa! (Kushaana)
Hajime no Ippo (Reiko Mikami)

2001
Motto! Ojamajo Doremi (Junji Manda, Yoko Manda)
Fruits Basket (Boy, Young Hatsuharu Soma, Mii)
Magical Meow Meow Taruto (Anzuko Doumyouji / Anko)

2002
Magical Shopping Arcade Abenobashi (Little Goblin, Sayaka Imamiya)
Tokyo Mew Mew (Mariko)
Dragon Drive (Sally)
Pita Ten (Sasha)

2003
Ashita no Nadja (Zabine)fu
Gunparade March (Mai Shibamura)
Tsuri Baka Nisshi (Dedyu)
Di Gi Charat Nyo (Francois Usada)
Pokémon Advance (Michelle)
Maburaho (Eri)
Wandaba Style (Furoku Tsukumo, Store Manager, Yokomaki)
One Piece (Sue)

2004
Koi Kaze (Kaname Chidori)
Zatch Bell! (Kido, Mamiko Takashi)
Yugo the Negotiator (Ruba)
Legendz: Yomigaeru Ryuuou Densetsu (Shuu)

2005
Aria the Animation (Agatha)
Noein - to your other self (Asuka Kaminogi)
Pokémon Advance (Lilian)
Fushigiboshi no Futagohime (Sophie)
Monster (Anna, Tomasz)
One Piece (Gombe)

2006
The Story of Saiunkoku (Shusui)
Hell Girl (Minato Fujie)
Shakugan no Shana (Mathilde Saint-Omer)
Fushigiboshi no Futagohime Gyu! (Sophie)
Nana (Nao Komatsu)
Futari wa Precure Splash Star (Foop)
Mushi-Shi (Kaji)

2007
Emily of New Moon (Perry Miller)
Kenko Zenrakei Suieibu Umisho (Kaname's Mother)
Kotetsushin Jeeg (Captain Midou)
D.Gray-man (Claudia)
Devil May Cry (Elise)
Pokémon: Diamond & Pearl (Saturn)
Lovely Complex (Risa Koizumi)
Rental Magica (Minagi Shinogi)

2008
The Telepathy Girl Ran (Reina Isozaki)
Natsume's Book of Friends (Hinoe)
Neuro: Supernatural Detective (Sakura Tsuyuki)

2009
Tamagotchi! (Mamiko)
Fullmetal Alchemist: Brotherhood (Paninya)
Detective Conan (Yasue Taira)
Yu-Gi-Oh! 5D's (Barbara)
One Piece (Aphelandra)

2010
Princess Jellyfish (Mayaya)
Shoka (Tsukikage)

2011
X-Men (Hisako's Mother)
Soreike! Anpanman (Kokurageman)
Digimon Xros Wars: The Young Hunters Who Leapt Through Time (Tokio Hinoki)
One Piece (Cocoa)

2012
Kamisama Kiss (Kamehime)
Mobile Suit Gundam AGE (Ayla Rose)

2013
Star Blazers 2199 (Mirenel Linke)

2014
HappinessCharge PreCure! (Hoshiiwa)
Pokémon XY (Lindsay)
Majin Bone (Chie Ryūjin)
Mekakucity Actors (Shion)
Detective Conan (Rumi Kitao)

2016
Erased (Akemi Hinazuki)
Detective Conan (Midori Koyanagi)

2017
One Piece (Young Vinsmoke Yonji)
Sin: The 7 Deadly Sins (Maria Totsuka's mother (ep. 12))

2018
Märchen Mädchen as Headmaster
Ninja Girl & Samurai Master 3rd Season as Ei
Skull-face Bookseller Honda-san as Armor

2019
The Morose Mononokean II (Aoi)

2021
The Idaten Deities Know Only Peace (Rin)

Original video animation
Agent Aika (1997) (Mina)
Sakura Taisen series (1997–2002) (Kasumi Fujii)
Mezzo Forte (2000) (Momomi Momoi)
Tales of Symphonia (2007–2011) (Sheena Fujibayashi)

Film animation
Porco Rosso (1992) (Fio Piccolo)
Hunter × Hunter (1998) (Mito Freecss)
One Piece: The Movie (2000) (Nami)
Sakura Wars: The Movie (2001) (Kasumi Fujii)
One Piece: Clockwork Island Adventure (2001) (Nami)
One Piece: Chopper's Kingdom on the Island of Strange Animals (Nami) (2002)
One Piece The Movie: Dead End Adventure (Nami) (2003)
One Piece: The Cursed Holy Sword (Nami) (2004)
Digimon Frontier: Island of the Lost Digimon (Bearmon) (2005)
One Piece: Baron Omatsuri and the Secret Island (Nami) (2005)
One Piece: The Giant Mechanical Soldier of Karakuri Castle (Nami) (2006)
One Piece Movie: The Desert Princess and the Pirates: Adventures in Alabasta (Nami) (2007)
Episode of Chopper Plus: Bloom in the Winter, Miracle Cherry Blossom (Nami) (2008)
One Piece Film: Strong World (Nami) (2009)
One Piece 3D: Straw Hat Chase (Nami) (2011)
One Piece Film: Z (Nami) (2012)
One Piece Film: Gold (Nami) (2016)
Natsume's Book of Friends The Movie: Ephemeral Bond (Hinoe) (2018)
One Piece: Stampede (Nami) (2019)
Natsume's Book of Friends: The Waking Rock and the Strange Visitor (Hinoe) (2021)
One Piece Film: Red (Nami) (2022)

Video games
Cowboy Bebop: Tsuioku no Serenade (2005) (Bianca)
The 13th Month (2022) (The Queen)

Unknown date 
Battle Stadium D.O.N (Nami)
Dragon Age II (Aveline)
Future GPX Cyber Formula series (Lisa Heinel)
Galaxy Angel (Shiva)
Galaxy Angel II (Shiva)
Gunparade March (Mai Shibamura)
Legendz: Gekitou Saga Battle (Shuzo Matsutani)
Lego Island (Valerie)
Night Trap (Megan)
Fullmetal Alchemist 2: Curse of the Crimson Elixir (Elma)
One Piece series (Nami)
Onimusha series (Snow Princess)
Princess Maker 5 (Cube)
Sakura Taisen series (Kasumi Fujii)
Samurai Warriors 2 (Nene)
Super Smash Bros. Ultimate (Mythra)
Tales of Symphonia series (Sheena Fujibayashi)
Ys I & II (Reah)
Fire Emblem Awakening (Emmeryn, Henry)
Need For Speed (Amy)

CD drama
Happy Time (????) (Mari)
Tales of Symphonia A Long Time Ago (????) (Sheena Fujibayashi)
Tales of Symphonia Rodeo Ride Tour (????) (Sheena Fujibayashi)

Dubbing roles

Live-action
Asteroid (Elliot McKee)
Final Destination (2002 TV Asahi edition) (Terry Chaney)
Looking for Jackie (Police Officer (Yihong Jiang))
Road to Avonlea (Felicity King)
Tidal Wave (Yoo-jin (Uhm Jung-hwa))
Ultraman: The Ultimate Hero (Karen Miller)

Animation
The Book of Pooh (Kessie)
Fievel's American Tails (Fievel)
Hello Kitty's Furry Tale Theater (Hello Kitty)
X-Men (Spiral)

References

External links
 
 
 Akemi Okamura at Hitoshi Doi's seiyuu database

1969 births
Japanese video game actresses
Japanese voice actresses
Singers from Tokyo
Voice actresses from Tokyo
Living people
Mausu Promotion voice actors
20th-century Japanese actresses
20th-century Japanese women singers
20th-century Japanese singers
21st-century Japanese actresses
21st-century Japanese women singers
21st-century Japanese singers